In enzymology, a sulfur oxygenase/reductase is an enzyme that catalyzes the chemical reaction

4 sulfur + 4 H2O + O2  2 hydrogen sulfide + 2 bisulfite + 2 H+

The 3 substrates of this enzyme are sulfur, H2O, and O2, whereas its 3 products are hydrogen sulfide, bisulfite, and H+.

This enzyme belongs to the family of oxidoreductases, specifically those acting on single donors with O2 as oxidant and incorporation of two atoms of oxygen into the substrate (oxygenases). The oxygen incorporated need not be derived from O2.  The systematic name of this enzyme class is sulfur:oxygen oxidoreductase (hydrogen-sulfide- and sulfite-forming). Other names in common use include SOR, sulfur oxygenase, and sulfur oxygenase reductase.

References

 
 
 
 

EC 1.13.11
Enzymes of unknown structure